G.E. Ranne is a pseudonym used by a pair of French authors who primarily write science fiction.  They have written texts for role-playing games including In Nomine Satanis/Magna Veritas.

Science Fiction Novels as G.E. Ranne

Le silence est d'or
Un regard vertical
La machoire du dragon
Chute libre

They also write medieval fantasy and comic book scripts for the comic book artist Varanda under the pseudonym Ange (Angel).

Fantasy Novels as Ange

Le peuple turquoise (Part 1 of Les trois lunes de Tanjore)
La flamme d'Harabec (Part 2 of Les trois lunes de Tanjore)

Ranne, G.E.